Youma Diakite (born  1 May 1971), also known simply as Youma, is a Malian model, actress, television personality and showgirl, mainly active in Italy. She is internationally known also as "the other Naomi" because she is very similar to Naomi Campbell.

Born in Mali and raised in Paris, Diakite became worldwide known at 18 years old when she was chosen by Benetton Group as spokesmodel for an advertising campaign. Moved to Italy in 1998, Diakite was a runway model for notable stylists including  Armani, Versace and Dolce & Gabbana. Diakite appeared in several television variety shows. She was also a contestant in the reality-talent show Ballando con le Stelle (Italian version of Dancing with the Stars) aired by Rai Uno and also in the reality-game show L'isola dei famosi (Italian version of Celebrity Survivor) aired by Canale 5. Diakite also appeared in John Wick: Chapter 2, an action film directed by Chad Stahelski in 2017. Diakite is also an international political activist against racism.

Filmography

References

External links 
 

1971 births
Living people
21st-century Malian actresses
Malian emigrants to France
Malian models
Participants in Italian reality television series
Malian women
Place of birth missing (living people)
Malian film actresses